Deschutes Hall is a building on the University of Oregon campus in Eugene, Oregon. Opened in the Winter term of 1990, it is home to the university's Computer Science department. The four-story building contains faculty and graduate student offices, boardrooms, and research laboratories.

As part of the Lorry I. Lokey Science Complex, it connects directly to the Lewis Integrative Science Building. Deschutes Hall takes a name given by French-Canadian trappers to the Deschutes River, important to Native American livelihood.

Images

See also
University of Oregon campus

References

External links 

UO  Department of Computer and Information Science (CIS)

University of Oregon buildings
University and college academic buildings in the United States
1990 establishments in Oregon